Nico Perrone (born April 27, 1935) is an Italian essayist, historian and journalist. He firstly discovered papers on the plot for killing Enrico Mattei, the Italian state tycoon for oil in the 1950s.

He is the author of twenty books, and some fifty shorter essays published in Italy, Denmark and the USA. He is the author also of a thousand leading articles and other contributions to Italian and Swiss newspapers.

Biography 
Born Nicola Carlo Perrone in Bari, the only son of Raffaele and Luisa Tortorella. His father was an Arditi volunteer during World War I and then a mass leader. Other relatives had strong national sentiments. In his family heritage a Garibaldi's volunteer and a Jacobin priest executed after he participated in 1799 revolution.

After World War II, due to a crisis of public schools Perrone attended for two years a Jesuit priests school, standing on the laical position of his parents but appreciating that severe and sophisticated method of teaching. Then graduated in Diplomatic History, and held scholarships for the University College Dublin (Ireland) and Sofiyski Universitet (Sofia University, Bulgaria).

Charged to study foreign labour laws for ENI, the Italian state oil holding (1961), in Rome. ENI president, Enrico Mattei, appointed him as an observer with the Italian Ministry for the Public Administration Reform; later he worked with a publisher in Bari. Invited in USA with the International Visitor Leadership Program, he received the honorary citizenship of the State of Nebraska (1986).

Co-editor for the Italian monthlies Storia in Rete (since 2005), and Giano (2003-2007).

Associate Professor of Contemporary History and American History at the University of Bari; he was director for the Institute of Modern and Contemporary History (1988–90, 1991–94), and professor for the European Union European Module in Social and Economic History of European Integration (1994–97).

He was visiting Professor in Denmark (Roskilde University, since 1991 - Copenhagen Business School, 1992, 1993 - University of Copenhagen, 2003), in Switzerland (Roskilde University master at Lugano, 1998, 2000), in Albania (Universiteti Zoja e Këshillit Të Mirë, Tirana, 2008), and in USA (Foreign Policy Research Institute, 1983). He was sometimes host professor at the University of Padua, Italy (1981, 1989).

Perrone has been a founder member, vice president (1995–96), member of the board (1991–98) for the EU European Education Programme on Society-Science & Technology, Louvain-la-Neuve, Belgium (master Society, Science & Technology in Europe). He is still member of the Advisory Board for the Federico Caffè Center at Roskilde University. He has been Bari University Rector's delegate for Denmark (2002-2006). He got Bari University Silver medal (2006).
 
Starting from 1982, Perrone is a contributor for RAI, the Italian state broadcasting company. He contributes to several newspapers in Italy and Switzerland (since 1971), and has been a contributor for the Westdeutscher Rundfunk (Cologne, Germany, 2001) and the Italian edition of Monthly Review.

Books 
 1980  America, series editor
 1989.  Mattei il nemico italiano. Politica e morte del presidente dell'ENI attraverso i documenti segreti (Mattei, the Italian Enemy. Death and Policy of ENI's President through Secret Papers), Milan, Leonardo Mondadori 
 1991.  Il dissesto programmato. Le partecipazioni statali nel sistema di consenso democristiano (The Planned Bankruptcy. The State Owned Industries in the Christian Democratic Consent System), Bari, Dedalo Libri 
 1992.  European and American Patterns in a Conflictive Development, Roskilde, RUC 
 1992.  Fjernt fra Maastricht. Far from Maastricht, Roskilde, RUC 
 1993.  La morte necessaria di Enrico Mattei (The Necessary Death of Enrico Mattei), Viterbo, Millelire Stampa Alternativa 
 1993.  The Strategic Stakes in Mattei's Flight, in EIR, Vol. 20, No. 23, Washington, DC, June 11, 1993 
 1995.  De Gasperi e l'America (America and De Gasperi. Under an Uncontrolled and Full Domination), Palermo, Sellerio 
 1995.  Obiettivo Mattei. Petrolio, Stati Uniti e politica dell'Eni (Target Mattei. Oil, United States and ENI Policy), Roma, Gamberetti 
 1996.  Maastricht from Scandinavia, Roskilde, RUCI In: Festschrift 14 papers in honour of Bruno Amoroso's 60th birthday 
 1996.  Alcide De Gasperi. L'Italia atlantica (Alcide De Gasperi: The Atlantic Italy), Rome, Manifestolibri 
 1996.  James Monroe. Il manifesto dell'imperialismo americano (James Monroe: The Manifesto of American Imperialism), Rome, Manifestolibri 
 1997.  John F. Kennedy. La nuova frontiera (James Monroe: The Manifest of American Imperialism), Rome, Manifestolibri 
 1998. The Mediterranean and the American Patronage 
 1999.  Giallo Mattei. I discorsi del fondatore dell'Eni che sfidò gli United States, la NATO e le Sette Sorelle (Mattei's Thriller. The Speeches of the Founder of ENI Who Challenged the USA, NATO, and the Seven Sisters), Rome, Stampa Alternativa Nuovi Equilibri 
 2000.  Il truglio. Infami, delatori e pentiti nel Regno di Napoli (The Muddle. Infamous, Delator, and Repentant People in the Kingdom of Naples), Palermo, Sellerio 
 2001.  Enrico Mattei, Bologna, Il Mulino, 2001 
 2002.  Il segno della DC. L’Italia dalla sconfitta al G7 (The DC Sign. Italy from Its Defeat to G-7), Bari, Dedalo Libri 
 2002.  Economia pubblica rimossa (The Public Economy Removed. The Italian State Participations from the Theory of Improper Burdens to the Privatization), in Studi in onore di Luca Buttaro, Milano, Giuffrè 
 2003.  The International Economy from a Political to an Authoritative Drive, in Globalisation and Welfare, Roskilde, Roskilde University Press 
 2006.  La Loggia della Philantropia (The Philantropia Lodge. A Danish Priest to Naples before the Revolution. With Masonic Papers and Other Documents), Palermo, Sellerio 
 2006.  Perché uccisero Enrico Mattei. Petrolio e guerra fredda nel primo grande delitto italiano (Why They Have Killed Enrico Mattei. Oil and Cold War in the First Great Italian Crime), Rome, L'Unità Libri
 2009.  L’inventore del trasformismo. Liborio Romano, strumento di Cavour per la conquista di Napoli (The Creator of Political Shifting. Liborio Romano, Cavour's Instrument for the Conquest of Naples), Soveria Mannelli, Rubbettino 
 2010.  Obama. Il peso delle promesse. Yes, we can't (Obama. Heavy Promises. Yes, We Can't), 1st and 2nd enlarged edition, Lamezia Terme, Settecolori 
 2011.  L'agente segreto di Cavour. Giuseppe Massari e il mistero del diario mutilato (Cavour's secret agent. Giuseppe Massari and the mystery of his mutilated diary), Bari, Palomar 
 2013.  Progetto di un impero. 1823. L'annuncio dell'egemonia americana infiamma la borsa (Project of an Empire. 1823. The Announcement of American Hegemony Inflames the Stock Exchange), Naples, La Città del Sole 
 2015.  La profezia di Sciascia. Una conversazione e quattro lettere, Milan, Archinto 
 2016.  Arrestate Garibaldi. L'ordine impossibile di Cavour, Rome, Salerno Editrice 
 2017.  La svolta occidentale. De Gasperi e il nuovo ruolo internazionale dell’Italia, Rome, Castelvecchi 
 2022.  Il realismo politico di De Gasperi. Fanfani invece vuole i missili americani, Rome, Bastogi

References

External links 

1935 births
Living people
People from Bari
Italian essayists
Italian male writers
20th-century Italian historians
Italian journalists
Italian male journalists
Male essayists
21st-century Italian historians